Peter Hosking (born 30 September 1932) is an Australian former cricketer. He played one first-class cricket match for Victoria in 1958.

See also
 List of Victoria first-class cricketers

References

External links
 

1932 births
Living people
Australian cricketers
Victoria cricketers
Cricketers from Melbourne